Scott Allan Norwood (born July 17, 1960) is a former American football placekicker who played in the National Football League (NFL) for seven seasons with the Buffalo Bills. He also played for the Birmingham Stallions in the United States Football League (USFL) for two seasons. As Buffalo's placekicker from 1985 to 1991, Norwood led the league in scoring for the 1988 season and played in their first two Super Bowl appearances. Despite his accomplishments, he is best known for missing a game-winning field goal attempt at the end of Super Bowl XXV.

Early life and college
Norwood was born in Alexandria, Virginia and graduated from Thomas Jefferson High School in Alexandria in 1978. He played both football and soccer at James Madison University and graduated with a business degree in 1982.

Professional career

Birmingham Stallions
Norwood began his professional career with the Birmingham Stallions of the United States Football League, playing two seasons before the Stallions signed Danny Miller to replace him.

Buffalo Bills
Norwood was one of many players the Bills picked up as the USFL contracted and ultimately collapsed; he eventually beat out Todd Schlopy (who would later come back when Norwood went on strike in 1987) for the Bills' starting kicker position. He quickly became an asset to an offense that was going places as the Bills' general manager, Bill Polian, assembled talent like Jim Kelly, Thurman Thomas, and Bruce Smith. Within two seasons of Norwood's arrival, the Bills had won the AFC East for the first time since 1980 and made it to the conference championship game. He soon overtook O. J. Simpson as the team's all-time leading scorer. Following the 1990 season, the Bills advanced to their first-ever Super Bowl.

Super Bowl XXV

Norwood's field goal range was unusually short for a professional kicker and he had difficulties in converting field goals over 40 yards throughout his career, especially on natural grass (the Bills' home stadium used AstroTurf, which mitigated this issue). Super Bowl XXV, which was played on January 27, 1991, cemented Norwood's name in football history when he missed a 47-yard field goal attempt with 8 seconds left in the game, giving the New York Giants their 2nd Super Bowl victory, and started the Bills' string of four consecutive Super Bowl losses.  This kick was made famous by the "wide right" call by ABC announcer Al Michaels.  Later video analysis revealed the holder mistakenly aligned the laces to the right, thereby positioning the kicked ball to fade right once in the air. 

Although the Bills signed Björn Nittmo as Norwood's potential replacement in the 1991 offseason, Norwood remained with the Bills through that season. The Bills returned to the Super Bowl and Norwood was perfect throughout the postseason, including a 44-yard field goal that served as the decisive margin in the AFC Championship Game against the Denver Broncos.  

Norwood was waived in the first roster move of the off-season after the Bills signed Steve Christie, formerly of the Tampa Bay Buccaneers.

Post-football career
After the Bills waived him, Norwood initially returned home to Northern Virginia and disappeared completely from the public eye for several years, eventually becoming an insurance salesman during the 1990s then moving back to Buffalo as a real estate agent in 2002.

NFL career statistics

Playoffs

Personal life
Norwood lives with his wife Kimberly in the Washington, D.C. suburb of Centreville, Virginia. They have three children: twins Carly and Connor (born 1995) and Corey (born 1996).

In popular culture
In the 1994 film Ace Ventura: Pet Detective, a key plot point involves a kicker for the Miami Dolphins named Ray Finkle; in the story, Finkle misses a field goal attempt in the closing moments of Super Bowl XVII, causing the Dolphins to lose the game by a single point–an obvious reference to Norwood's infamous kick in Super Bowl XXV. (In reality, Super Bowl XVII was contested between the Dolphins and the Washington Redskins; the Redskins won 27-17.)

The 1998 film Buffalo '66 features a subplot where main character Billy Brown, played by Vincent Gallo, attempts to murder a former Buffalo kicker named "Scott Wood", whose missed field goal led to Brown losing a large bet and serving a prison term when he took the fall for his bookie.

References

Paul Jannace, "Norwood’s life after football is business as usual" www.wellsvilledaily.com, March 29, 2010

1960 births
Living people
American Conference Pro Bowl players
American football placekickers
Birmingham Stallions players
Buffalo Bills players
James Madison Dukes football players
People from Centreville, Virginia
Players of American football from Virginia
Sportspeople from Alexandria, Virginia